Chelsea Andrea Aurelea Verhaegh (born 11 June 2000) is a Dutch figure skater who currently competes in ice dance with partner Sherim van Geffen. With van Geffen, she is the 2020 Dutch national champion, and competed at the 2021 World Figure Skating Championships.

Personal life 
Verhaegh was born on 11 June 2000 in Eindhoven, Netherlands.

Career

Early years 
Verhaegh began learning how to skate in 2007 as a seven-year-old. She trained as a single skater through the end of the 2018–19 season before transitioning to ice dance in the summer of 2019. In singles, Verhaegh competed internationally through the junior level.

Programs

With van Geffen

Competitive highlights 
CS: Challenger Series

Ice dance with van Geffen

References

External links
News articles of Verhaegh at schaatsen.nl 

Dutch female ice dancers
Dutch sportswomen
Living people
2000 births